Lookout is an unincorporated area in Wayne County, Pennsylvania, United States.

History
A post office called Lookout was established in 1889, and remained in operation until 1969. The community was so named on account of its lofty elevation.

References

Unincorporated communities in Wayne County, Pennsylvania
Unincorporated communities in Pennsylvania